Neshka Stefanova Robeva (born 26 May 1946) is a Bulgarian former Rhythmic Gymnast and coach.

Biography 
Born in Rousse, Robeva graduated from the Bulgarian State Choreography School in "Bulgarian Dances" in 1966 and since then had been a member of the Bulgarian national rhythmic gymnastics squad until 1973. She took part in four World Championships. (1967, 1969, 1971, 1973)

In 1974 Robeva graduated from the High Institute for Sports (now National Sports Academy) and started work as a coach at the "Levski-Spartak" club. The same year she was appointed head coach of the Bulgarian National Team and she remained in that position until 1999. This was a very successful period for Bulgarian rhythmic gymnastics. However, Robeva, while given credit for her exceptional work as a coach, was also criticized for imposing too harsh discipline and regimen on her trainees: Stela Salapatiyska and Bianka Panova have publicly stated that they were insulted and harshly beaten by Robeva.

The 25 years under Robeva's leadership will be remembered as the “Golden Girls Century” of the Bulgarian school in rhythmic gymnastics and her European and World champions as the “Golden Girls of Bulgaria". The successes of several generations of Bulgarian gymnasts are closely related with her name. In World, European and Olympic championships Neshka's gymnasts won 294 medals.

In 1988 Neshka was the choreographer and dance producer for the dance in the film Acatamus from the director Georgi Djulgerov. From 1993 until 1997 she was a member of the European Gymnastics Committee. Neshka is currently the president of the Levski rhythmic gymnastics club.

References

External links
 
 
 

1946 births
Living people
Bulgarian rhythmic gymnasts
Sportspeople from Ruse, Bulgaria
Medalists at the Rhythmic Gymnastics World Championships